Dekeyseria pulchra is a species of armored catfish native to Brazil, Colombia and Venezuela where it is found in the upper Rio Negro, Orinoco and Casiquiare canal basins.  This species grows to a length of  SL.  D. pulcher is noted to be an algae-eater.

References 
 

Ancistrini
Catfish of South America
Freshwater fish of Brazil
Freshwater fish of Colombia
Fish of Venezuela
Fish described in 1915